Lindsay Edward Fox  (born ) is an Australian businessman. In 1956, Fox founded the Australian logistics company Linfox, where as of 2015 he serves as non-executive chairman.

Early life 
Lindsay Fox was born around 1937 and brought up in Prahran, a suburb of Melbourne. He was educated at Melbourne High School, but was asked to leave during Year 10, at age 16, due to his lack of academic interest. He started working as a truck driver and was able to use this as a springboard to found Linfox.

Football career
For many of his earlier years, Fox played Australian rules football with moderate success. Recruited from the St Kilda Football Club's thirds side (which he captained), Fox was sent to Golden Point Football Club in the Ballarat Football League before he returned to make his Victorian Football League debut for St Kilda in 1960. He did not think much of his footballing abilities, but as a ruckman he went on to play 20 games (for 3 goals) from 1959 to 1961. Following his stint in the VFL, he went to the Victorian Football Association (VFA), playing firstly for Moorabbin, where he won a premiership, and then for Brighton-Caulfield, where he moved after Moorabbin's expulsion from the VFA.

He later returned in an administrative role, becoming the president of the St Kilda Football Club in 1979 .

Business interests 
Fox started Linfox in 1956 with one truck.

He also took ownership of Melbourne's Luna Park in late 2005.  In 2006, he made an unsuccessful bid for the development of the neighboring 'Triangle Site' on St Kilda's foreshore. The property was subsequently destroyed by fire.

He has been involved with a number of high-profile disputes with the Government relating to his property development activities. In the late 1990s he attempted to claim the public beach area in front of his holiday home as a private helipad for his helicopter and to build a high security compound for himself and his family.  This development was rejected by the Victorian Planning Minister. However he has also been able to use his government contacts to gain favorable treatment by being granted permission to land his helicopter near his Portsea home on crown land.

Fox has been in dispute with the local council of his  mansion by attempting to have the heritage listing that applies to all homes in the street removed from his property. His son's Toorak home was destroyed by fire.

Awards and recognition 
Fox was appointed an Officer of the Order of Australia in the Australia Day Honours' List of 1992, in recognition of service to the transport industry and to the community. In 2001, he was awarded the Centenary Medal.

In 2008, Fox was appointed a Companion of the Order of Australia (AC), in recognition of his continued service to the transport and logistics industries, to business through the development and promotion of youth traineeships, and to the community through a range of philanthropic endeavours.

In April 2022, it was announced that the new gallery, part of the National Gallery of Victoria (NGV) would be named The Fox: NGV Contemporary, in recognition of a $100 million donation from the Foxes.

Personal life
Fox married Paula Grace Peele in 1959 (now Paula Fox .), and they have six children, all born before he was 30 years old.

In 2004 on the ABC TV George Negus Tonight program, Fox's work ethic and business savviness was profiled. When asked by George Negus how he describes himself politically, Fox replied: "I guess, Labor think I'm Liberal, Liberal think I'm Labor, the Catholics think I'm Protestant, the Protestants think I'm Catholic. The local rabbi delivers me matzah. So I guess, bottom line, I'm an Australian". Fox went on to say: "I, traditionally, probably, was brought up in a working-class family where the old man would turn in his grave if he'd thought I'd have voted Liberal. But I must admit, from probably 25 up to the last election, I would have voted Liberal and supported Liberal quite strongly. But I was completely disillusioned by the lack of statesmanship with our Prime Minister with the Ansett debacle. He had an opportunity to be a statesman. Instead he took on a political role and as a result of that, the demise of Ansett came about".

Following the suicide of his son Michael in 1991, Fox advised the Federal and Victorian governments on youth suicide and is on the board of the National Advisory Council on Suicide Prevention. In 1992 he was named "Victorian Father of the Year". In an interview with George Negus in August 2004, Fox spoke of the loss of his son: "Well, life is about being up and being down and being able to get up again. And in my walks of life, I guess I thought I was invincible till one of my sons committed suicide. And at that point of time, I knew I wasn't invincible ... I'd give up everything if we could get Michael back. He's got a special place in each and every one of the hearts of our family and he'll always be there and he'll never grow old."

Net worth
In 2019, The Australian Financial Review assessed Fox's net worth at 3.72 billion, listed on the 2020 Rich List. , Fox was one of ten Australians who have appeared in every Financial Review Rich List, or its predecessor, the BRW Rich 200, since it was first published in 1984. Meanwhile, in 2019 Forbes assessed his net worth at 3.50 billion, on the list of Australia's 50 richest people.

References 

Businesspeople from Melbourne
Australian truck drivers
1937 births
Living people
St Kilda Football Club administrators
St Kilda Football Club players
Caulfield Football Club players
Moorabbin Football Club players
Companions of the Order of Australia
People educated at Melbourne High School
Australian rules footballers from Melbourne
Golden Point Football Club players
Delegates to the Australian Constitutional Convention 1998
Australian billionaires
Officers of the Order of Australia
20th-century Australian businesspeople
21st-century Australian businesspeople
People from Prahran, Victoria
People from Toorak, Victoria
Australian businesspeople in transport